Amarsinh Pandit Born 30 May 1964 is an Indian politician and member of the Nationalist Congress Party. Pandit is a member of the Maharashtra Legislative Council from the Georai constituency in Beed district as Nationalist Congress Party candidate.

References 

People from Beed district
Bharatiya Janata Party politicians from Maharashtra
Members of the Maharashtra Legislative Assembly
Living people
21st-century Indian politicians
Nationalist Congress Party politicians from Maharashtra
Year of birth missing (living people)